The Coventry Alliance Football League, formerly known as the Coventry Works League, is an association football competition in England that is composed of five divisions, currently containing in total 50 teams.

Member clubs 2021-22

Premier Division
Folly Lane FC                    
Stockton FC                        
Dunlop FC                         
Copeswood(Cov)FC                
Coventry Colliery               
Rugby Borough Alliance                           
AFC Binley            
Jet Blades FC                     
Christ The King FC                
Triumph Athletic

Division One
Folly Lane Res                  
AFC Coventry                      
Fillongley FC                     
Rs Sports                       
Christ The King Res             
Polonia Coventry FC            
Coundon Court O.B.              
Fissc FC                        
Gurdwara Gnp FC                
Triumph Athletic Res

Division Two
Whitnash                    
Coventry Colliery Res           
Dunlop Res                     
Kenilworth Wardens              
Christ The King III             
AFC Binley Res                  
Crick                           
Shilton                         
Jaguar-Daimler
Brinklow

Division Three
Bourton & Frankton FC                     
Crick Res                       
Balsall&Berkswell Hornets F.C.                        
Coventrians FC                    
Coventry Sky Blues/Dunlop Thirds              
Bulkington Poppys                         
Rugby Borough Alliance Reserves                  
Kenilworth Wardens Res          
Craven Athletic F.C.          
Coundon Court FC

Division Four
Kenilworth Sporting               
Red Lion Rangers F.C.                   
Striders FC                     
Folly Lane Thirds               
Stockingford Aa Pavilio         
Yelvertoft F C                  
Craftsman FC                    
Stockton Reserves               
Woodlands W.M.C.                
Jet Blades Res                  
Shilton Res                     
Rs Sports Res
AFC Binley Thirds
GNP Sports

Recent champions

References

External links

 
Football leagues in England
Sport in Coventry
Football in the West Midlands (county)